Donald Lee O'Riley (March 12, 1945 – May 2, 1997) was a Major League Baseball pitcher who played for two seasons. He pitched in 18 games for the Kansas City Royals during the inaugural 1969 season and nine games during the 1970 season. He was traded along with Pat Kelly from the Royals to the Chicago White Sox for Gail Hopkins and John Matias on October 13, 1970. 

O'Riley died at age 52 after being fatally shot during a convenience store robbery.

References

External links

Venezuelan Professional Baseball League statistics

1945 births
1997 deaths
1997 murders in the United States
Arizona Instructional League Athletics players
Baseball players from Kansas
Birmingham A's players
Burlington Bees players
Deaths by firearm in Missouri
Florida Instructional League Royals players
Kansas City Royals players
Llaneros de Acarigua players
Major League Baseball pitchers
American murder victims
Omaha Royals players
Peninsula Grays players
Sportspeople from Topeka, Kansas
People murdered in Missouri
Richmond Braves players
Vancouver Mounties players